Mark Alfano is an American philosopher and Associate Professor of Philosophy at Macquarie University. He is the editor of The Moral Psychology of the Emotions, a series of books published by Rowman & Littlefield. Alfano is known for his research on virtue ethics., virtue epistemology, social epistemology, and Friedrich Nietzsche.

Books

Selected publications

References

External links 

 Mark Alfano’s website

Year of birth missing (living people)
Living people
21st-century American philosophers
Academic staff of Macquarie University